Forever and Ever is the fifth album by German band Dune. It was released in 1998 on the label Orbit Records.

As was the case with their previous album Forever, Forever and Ever contains covers of famous pop song performed in a classical style, accompanied by The London Session Orchestra, with every other song in between being an original piano composition. Recording of the orchestral tracks took place at CTS Studios in London.

The singer on this album is Tina Lacebal.

Track listing
All even-numbered songs written by Bernd Burhoff and Jens Oettrich. All other writers and original artists noted below.

 "One Of Us" (Benny Andersson, Björn Ulvaeus) – 3:50 (original by ABBA)
 "Millennium" – 1:03
 "Almaz" (Randy Crawford) – 4:26 (original by Randy Crawford)
 "Open Letter" – 1:08
 "A Question Of Lust" (Martin Gore) – 4:17 (original by Depeche Mode)
 "Early Voyage" – 2:13
 "Memories Fade" (Roland Orzabal) – 5:20 (original by Tears for Fears)
 "This Waiting Earth" – 2:57
 "Hello" (Lionel Richie) – 3:56 (original by Lionel Richie)
 "Behind The Mask" – 3:14
 "Save A Prayer" (Simon Le Bon, Roger Taylor, Andy Taylor, John Taylor, Nick Rhodes) – 5:51 (original by Duran Duran)
 "Out of This World" – 4:08
 "Forever Young" (Marian Gold, Frank Mertens, Bernhard Lloyd) – 3:56 (original by Alphaville)
 "Nightfall" – 2:48
 "Here Comes The Flood" (Peter Gabriel) – 4:38 (original by Peter Gabriel)

A hidden track follows track 15; 15 minutes of untitled piano music begin playing starting at 10:00 into the track, after about five minutes of silence.

1998 albums
Dune (band) albums